Wang Hee-kyung (born July 16, 1970) is a South Korean archer and Olympic champion. She competed at the 1988 Summer Olympics in Seoul, where she won a gold medal with the South Korean archery team, and also an individual silver medal.

References

External links
 

1970 births
Living people
South Korean female archers
Olympic archers of South Korea
Archers at the 1988 Summer Olympics
Olympic gold medalists for South Korea
Olympic silver medalists for South Korea
Olympic medalists in archery
Medalists at the 1988 Summer Olympics
20th-century South Korean women